Opazo (Latin America: ,) is a Spanish surname.

Notable people with this surname include:
 Daniel Opazo (born 1996), Argentinian footballer
 Diego Opazo (born 1991), Chilean footballer
 Mario Opazo (born 1969), Colombian artist
 Mirko Opazo (born 1991), Chilean footballer
 Óscar Opazo (born 1990), Chilean footballer
 Yerson Opazo (born 1984), Chilean footballer

See also
 Pedro Opaso (same pronunciation) (1876-1957), Chilean politician